The 11th TVyNovelas Awards is an Academy of special awards to the best telenovelas and TV shows. The awards ceremony took place on March 29, 1993 in the Centro de Espectáculos "Premier" in Mexico D.F. The ceremony was televised in Mexico by El canal de las estrellas.

Raúl Velasco, Liza Echeverría, Rebecca de Alba, Luis de la Corte and Lorena Tassinari hosted the show. De frente al sol won 8 awards, including Best Telenovela, the most for the evening. Other winners María Mercedes won 6 awards, El abuelo y yo won 3 awards, Las secretas intenciones won 2 awards and Baila conmigo won 1 award.

Summary of awards and nominations

Winners and nominees

Telenovelas

Others

Special Awards 
 Best Telenovela by Televisa delivered by the then owner of Televisa Emilio Azcárraga Milmo: Los Ricos También Lloran, delivered to Valentín Pimstein, Verónica Castro and Rogelio Guerra
 Best Album 1992: "Romance" by Luis Miguel
 Best Ranchero Singer: Lucero
 Best Hair of the Year: Chao and Daniela Leites
 Best Producer and Hostess: Verónica Castro
 Lifetime Achievement of Artistic Career: Antonio Aguilar and Silvia Derbez
 Support and Rescue of Mexican Romantic Music "La Hora Azul": Carlos Amador, Jaime Almeida and Susana Dosamantes.

International Segment 
This segment is transmitted only in the United States for Univisión:
 News Program: Noticiario Univisión
 Actress Revelation of the Year: Sonya Smith for Cara sucia
 Best Host: Mario Kreutzberger for Sábado Gigante
 Best Hostess: Cristina Saralegui for El Show de Cristina
 Best Telenovela: María Mercedes

Missing 
People who did not attend ceremony wing and were nominated in the shortlist in each category:
 Anabel Ferreira
 Fernando Ciangherotti
 Luis Miguel

References 

TVyNovelas Awards
TVyNovelas Awards
TVyNovelas Awards
TVyNovelas Awards ceremonies